Galmoy may refer to:
 Galmoy, County Kilkenny, village in Ireland
 Galmoy (barony), administrative barony centred on the village
 Galmoy Mine, mine near the village
 Viscount Galmoy, title in the Peerage of Ireland

See also
 Galmoy Hurdle, Irish National Hunt horserace run at Gowran Park
 Galmo Williams, Premier of the Turks and Caicos Islands in 2009